Kim Eng Holdings Limited is a securities and investment broker in Asia. It was incorporated in 1972 to provide stock broking services in Singapore. The group's network coverage spans 10 countries; servicing institutional, corporate, high-net-worth and retail investors. Kim Eng Holdings is a full-fledged member of stock exchanges in Singapore, Hong Kong, Indonesia, Thailand, Philippines, Vietnam and India.

In January 2011, it was announced that Maybank has acquired Kim Eng for a sum of S$1.8 billion. Under the deal, Maybank is acquiring a 44.6 percent stake in Kim Eng Holdings at S$3.10 a share. This also translates to 15.44 percent from the CEO Mr Ronald Ooi and 29.19 per cent stake from Yuanta Securities Asia Financial Services.

Business activities
Through its various subsidiaries, Kim Eng offers financial services such as:
 Securities Trading
 Research
 Online Trading
 Share Financing
 Corporate Finance
 Custodian & Nominee Services
 Equity Derivatives & Structured Products
 Mutual Funds
 Hedge Funds
 Trust & Fiduciary Services

References

External links 
 
 Top Thai broker Kim Eng Q2 net profit up 35 pct – Reuters
 S'pore's Kim Eng, Mitsubishi UFJ to form fund JV – Reuters India
 Mitsubishi UFJ to Raise Stake in Singapore's Kim Eng – Bloomberg
 Kim Eng Says Higher Thai Share Trading to Lift Profit – Bloomberg
 MUFJ unit takes big Kim Eng stake – Japan Times
 Kim Eng Securities' Hiang Hong Seah – Forbes

Financial services companies of Singapore
Mitsubishi UFJ Financial Group
Singaporean companies established in 1972